Liscomb is a city in Marshall County, Iowa, United States. The population was 291 at the time of the 2020 census.

History
Liscomb was platted in 1869. It was named for an official of the Iowa Central Railroad.

Geography
Liscomb is located at  (42.190610, -93.005662).

Demographics

2010 census
As of the census of 2010, there were 301 people, 118 households, and 82 families living in the city. The racial makeup of the city was 93.0% White, 3.0% Asian, 2.7% from other races, and 1.3% from two or more races. Hispanic or Latino of any race were 2.0% of the population.

There were 118 households, of which 36.4% had children under the age of 18 living with them, 51.7% were married couples living together, 9.3% had a female householder with no husband present, 8.5% had a male householder with no wife present, and 30.5% were non-families. 22.0% of all households were made up of individuals, and 11% had someone living alone who was 65 years of age or older. The average household size was 2.55 and the average family size was 2.91.

The median age in the city was 37.5 years. 26.9% of residents were under the age of 18; 8.3% were between the ages of 18 and 24; 23.8% were from 25 to 44; 25.8% were from 45 to 64; and 15% were 65 years of age or older. The gender makeup of the city was 48.8% male and 51.2% female.

2000 census
As of the census of 2000, there were 272 people, 113 households, and 72 families living in the city. The racial makeup of the city was 98.16% White, 0.37% Native American, and 1.47% from two or more races.

There were 113 households, out of which 31.0% had children under the age of 18 living with them, 54.0% were married couples living together, 7.1% had a female householder with no husband present, and 35.4% were non-families. 31.0% of all households were made up of individuals, and 17.7% had someone living alone who was 65 years of age or older. The average household size was 2.41, and the average family size was 3.00.

Age spread: 25.0% under the age of 18, 7.7% from 18 to 24, 28.7% from 25 to 44, 22.1% from 45 to 64, and 16.5% who were 65 years of age or older. The median age was 39 years. For every 100 females, there were 90.2 males. For every 100 females age 18 and over, there were 100.0 males.

The median income for a household in the city was $40,000, and the median income for a family was $41,071. Males had a median income of $28,750 versus $21,667 for females. The per capita income for the city was $16,678. About 9.2% of families and 8.1% of the population were below the poverty line, including 5.2% of those under the age of eighteen and 10.3% of those 65 or over.

Education
BCLUW Community School District operates public schools serving Liscomb. The schools are BCLUW Elementary School in Conrad, BCLUW Middle School in Union, and BCLUW High School in Conrad.

The Beaman-Conrad-Liscomb school district served Liscomb until July 1, 1992, when it merged into BCLUW.

References

External links
 BCLUW (Beaman, Conrad, Liscomb, Union and Whitten) School District homepage
 The Record Website

Cities in Iowa
Cities in Marshall County, Iowa